Lajas is a barrio in the municipality of Lajas, Puerto Rico. Its population in 2010 was 2,694.

See also

 List of communities in Puerto Rico

References

Barrios of Lajas, Puerto Rico